Gelu Lisac (born 19 November 1967) is a Romanian former water polo player who competed in the 1996 Summer Olympics.

See also
 Romania men's Olympic water polo team records and statistics
 List of men's Olympic water polo tournament goalkeepers

References

External links
 

1967 births
Living people
Romanian male water polo players
Water polo goalkeepers
Olympic water polo players of Romania
Water polo players at the 1996 Summer Olympics